The Bistrica is a left tributary of the Drina. It springs out of the massif of Treskavica mountain. The source-group is made up of a dozen smaller springs and streams, while the Bistrica spring itself is located in a cave at 1280 m above sea level at the site of Siljevice.

The length of the river is 43.3 km, its catchment area is 425.0 km², and its mouth is located at Vučijak locality in Brod na Drini, near Foča, at 394 m above sea level. The most significant left tributaries are the Drazenica river at 10.8 km long, and the Miljevka river at 13.2 km long, while the right tributaries are the Oteša river at 15.2 km long, and the Govza river at 21.9 km long.

References

Literature 

 
Rivers of Bosnia and Herzegovina
Foča
Drina basin
Tributaries of the Drina
Bosnian Podrinje Canton